Stélio Newton Craveirinha (3 March 1950 – 11 October 2020) was a Mozambican athlete. He competed in the men's long jump at the 1980 Summer Olympics.

References

External links
 

1950 births
2020 deaths
Athletes (track and field) at the 1980 Summer Olympics
Mozambican male long jumpers
Olympic athletes of Mozambique
Place of birth missing